A pie (abbreviated as Ps) was a unit of currency in India, Burma and Pakistan until 1947. During the mid-nineteenth century, one pie was worth 12 cowry.

Minting of the pie ended in 1942, though it remained in circulation for a further five years. The pie was demonetized in 1947 as it had become practically worthless due to inflation.

Notation
The first number is the number of rupees, the second is the number of annas (1/16), the third is the number of paise (1/64), and the fourth is the number of pies (1/192). Examples are below.

Rs 1/15/3/2 = Rs 1.9947Rs 1/8/3 = Rs 1.546Rs 1/4 = Rs 1.25

Notes

References

Pie
Historical currencies of India